Willie Mathieson (born 20 July 1943) is a Scottish former professional footballer who played in the left-back position for Rangers, amongst other clubs. He was included in the Rangers F.C. Hall of Fame on 5 February 2007.

Mathieson spent fifteen seasons at Rangers from 1960 to 1975 and was involved in the club's historic 1972 Cup Winners' Cup winning team. He played in over 300 games for Rangers, including the 1973 Scottish Cup Final winning side. Mathieson represented the Scottish League once, in 1969.

He transferred to Arbroath for the 1975–76 season, playing 25 league games (scoring three times) and then moved on to Raith Rovers for a final season (making 13 appearances). After retirement he joined the Berwick Rangers coaching staff, working under former teammate Dave Smith. Berwick won the Second Division championship, which was their first-ever trophy.

Mathieson is now retired and lives in Auchterarder.

References

External links

Profile at rangers.co.uk

1943 births
Living people
Sportspeople from St Andrews
Association football fullbacks
Scottish footballers
Rangers F.C. players
Arbroath F.C. players
Raith Rovers F.C. players
Scottish Football League players
Scottish Football League representative players
St Andrews United F.C. players
People from Cardenden
Footballers from Fife